Laurie River Airport  is located  west of Laurie River, Manitoba, Canada.

References

External links

Registered aerodromes in Manitoba